This is a list of fictional canines in comics, and is subsidiary to the list of fictional canines. It is a collection of various notable non-dog canine characters. Dogs can be found under comics in the list of fictional dogs. Wolves can be found under comics in the list of fictional wolves.

References

Comics
Canines
Canines